Kitsilano Pool is an outdoor saltwater swimming pool, located at Kitsilano Beach in Vancouver, British Columbia, Canada. At 137 metres long, it is the longest outdoor swimming pool in North America.

History 
Kitsilano Pool is situated at an area known to the Coast Salish people as Skwa-yoos, at the site of a former shell midden.

Kitsilano Pool opened August 15, 1931 by BC Provincial Attorney-General R.L. (Royal Lethington) Maitland and Vancouver Park Board chairman Fred Crone, and originally was billed as "America's Largest Swimming Pool". The original pool was an elliptical shape,  and 2–8 feet deep, covering 2.3 acres, and containing 1.3 million litres of water. The project cost $50,000 at the time. It was filled by tidal water from English Bay and sealife such as mud sharks and octopuses were occasionally found in the pool. It was designed as a spot for bathers to swim during low tide, and had a sandy bottom until the 1960s, when it was filled with cement. 5,000 people showed up on the opening day to experience the magnificent new oceanside swimming pool.

In 1978, the pool was replaced with the current design due to health concerns because of a lack of water circulation. The construction started in November 1977 and was scheduled to be completed by July 15, 1978, but due to delays was not completed until September 1978. This was too late for the summer swim season, so the new Kitsilano Pool opening was delayed until 1979. Designed by architect Ronald B. Howard and built at a cost of $2.2 million by Key Construction Ventures, the new pool featured heated water and a pump that pumped saltwater into the pool from English Bay. A seawall walkway around Kits pool was constructed at the same time.

In 2018, Kitsilano Pool underwent a major upgrade to reduce the amount of potable water used by the pool by 80%. The upgrade cost $3.3 million, $500,000 of which was paid by the Government of Canada, and the remainder by the City of Vancouver. The pool basin membrane and caulking were replaced, and repairs were done on the gutter and pool deck structure.

Today 
Today, Kitsilano pool is a very popular swimming spot in Vancouver, operated by the Vancouver Board of Parks and Recreation. The pool normally opens on the Victoria Day long weekend and remains open until mid to late September. It is divided into three sections: a shallow section for children and family swimming, roped-off lanes for lap swimming and exercising, and a deep end for casual swimming, making it a great spot for a variety of people to do their summer swimming.

Awards and recognition 
 Third on Red Bull's list of "The Top 10 Sexiest Swimming Pools to Train in" (2018)
 CNN Travel's "World's Best Tidal and Oceanside Pools" (2019)
 CNN Travel's "20 of the World's Best Places for Swimming" (2020)

References 

 
 Kitsilano outdoor pool to reopen with saltier waters after major renovation | Urbanized
 Kits Pool has brought waves of enjoyment over the years
 
 The Vancouver Sun, August 16, 1978, page A9

Kitsilano
Swimming pools
Swimming in Canada
1931 establishments in British Columbia